Alexsandro Ribeiro da Silva (born April 16, 1980) is a Brazilian football forward who plays for Brazilian side Mogi Mirim Esporte Clube.

He played for several clubs, including Associação Atlética Coruripe, South Korean League side Daegu FC and Chinese Super League side Nanchang Bayi.

Alexsandro previously played for Centro Sportivo Alagoano in the Copa do Brasil.

References

External links
 

Living people
1980 births
Brazilian expatriate footballers
Brazilian footballers
Associação Atlética Coruripe players
Expatriate footballers in South Korea
Daegu FC players
Brazilian expatriate sportspeople in South Korea
K League 1 players
Expatriate footballers in China
Shanghai Shenxin F.C. players
Chinese Super League players
Brazilian expatriate sportspeople in China
Agremiação Sportiva Arapiraquense players
Mogi Mirim Esporte Clube players
Association football forwards
People from Maceió
Sportspeople from Alagoas